The Cathedral of Zamora is a Catholic cathedral in Zamora, in Castile and León, Spain, located  above the right bank of the Duero It remains surrounded by its old walls and gates.

Built between 1151 and 1174, it is one of the finest examples of Spanish Romanesque architecture.

History
A previous church, also entitled El Salvador ("Holy Savior") existed at the time of King Alfonso VII of Castile but it was apparently in ruins, so that the king donated the church of St. Thomas in the city to act as cathedral.

The church was built under Bishop Esteban of the Diocese of Zamora, under the patronage of Alfonso VII  and his sister, Sancha Raimúndez. The date of construction (1151–1174) is traditionally attested by an epigraphy in the northern side of the transept, although recent discoveries have proven that the church had been already begun in 1139, at the time of bishop Bernardo.

The cathedral was consecrated in 1174 by bishop Esteban, and works continued under his successor Guillermo (1176–1192), including the transept. The cloister and the bell tower date to the first half of the 13th century. The designer of the church is unknown.

Overview

The building, in Romanesque style, is on the Latin cross plan; it has a nave and two aisles, a short transept and three semicircular apses. The latter were replaced by Gothic ones in the 15th century. The transept is covered by barrel vault, the aisles by groin vault, and the nave by cross vault in late-Romanesque or Proto-Gothic style.

Over the transept is the dome-tower, featuring 16 side narrow and tall semicircular windows enclosed in and between four turrets. These support two domes, an external one with a slightly pointed top, and an interior one with semicircular shape. Over the turrets are small domes, also with columns and thin windows, and tympani with similar decoration.  With its exterior, original scale decoration, the dome is one of the symbols of the city.
Similar domes are found in other churches of the Duero valley (Salamanca, Toro, Plasencia, Evora).
Several inspirations for the dome have been proposed, from Byzantium to France.
Miguel Sobrino has argued for a now-disappeared Romanesque dome over the Cathedral of Santiago de Compostela.

It is divided into three vertical sectors, divided by blind columns and topped by semicircular arcades. In the lower sides are lunettes with Romanesque sculptures.

Notable features of the interior include the choir-stalls constructed in 1512–1516 by Juan de Bruselas, carved not only with figures of saints and famous men of antiquity but also with vigorous and earthy scenes of country life. The  has a marble table, and the high altar is flanked by two Mudéjar pulpits.

The  (named after cardinal Juan de Mella), also at the east end, has an altar by Fernando Gallego, in Gothic-Flemish style (1490–1494).

The bell tower, with a height of 45 m, was built in the 13th century in Romanesque style.

Cathedral Museum 
The Cathedral Museum, in the 17th century cloister, is notable particularly for its fine Flemish tapestries of the 15th–17th centuries depicting scenes from the Trojan War, Hannibal's Italian campaign, and the life of Tarquin the Etruscan king of Rome. Another treasure is a Late Gothic monstrance of 1515.

Other burials
Ponce Giraldo de Cabrera

See also
 History of medieval Arabic and Western European domes

References

Bibliography

External links 

 Photos

Buildings and structures completed in 1174
12th-century Roman Catholic church buildings in Spain
Roman Catholic churches in Castile and León
Zamora
Romanesque architecture in Castile and León
Church buildings with domes
Buildings and structures in Zamora, Spain